Charles M. Romero (born June 7, 1989 in Mansfield, Massachusetts) is an American soccer player who played for the Charleston Battery in the USL Professional Division.

Career

Youth and College
Romero played soccer at Bishop Feehan High School in Attleboro, Massachusetts. At Bishop Feehan  Romero was a team captain and a two-time All-conference player as well as an AEMASS, Sun-Chronicle, and Pawtucket Times All-Star.  Romero also played Varsity basketball and served as captain of the track team. He was named Male Scholar Athlete of the year.

Romero played college soccer at Williams College. Over a 4-year career he started 51 out of 73 games and scored 21 goals (9 game-winners) and collected 14 assists. In 2009 Romero led the NESCAC in points, goals, and game-winners while leading the Ephs to the NCAA National Semi-Finals. Romero was a two-time All-NESCAC, two-time All-ECAC, and two-time NSCAA All-Region. After his Senior season he was named both NSCAA All-America and NSCAA Scholar All-America.

Professional
In the fall of 2011, Romero caught on with the New England Revolution Reserve team and appeared in two games. Romero then spent a few months in Iceland training with Valur and Íþróttabandalag Vestmannaeyja (IBV) of the Úrvalsdeild which is the top tier of Icelandic soccer.

At the end of January 2012, Romero was one of 102 players invited to the USL Pro Soccer Combine in Bradenton, FL. Romero netted four goals in the event's final scrimmage and Charleston Battery coach Mike Anhaeuser invited him to preseason. During preseason Romero featured for the Battery in the Carolina Challenge Cup matches against D.C. United and the Columbus Crew. The Battery signed Romero in early April 2012 and Romero earned his first career start playing all 93 minutes on 4/14/2012 against the Richmond Kickers.

Personal life

References

External links
 Charleston Battery profile

1989 births
Living people
American soccer players
Charleston Battery players
USL Championship players
Williams Ephs men's soccer players
Association football forwards
Association football midfielders